Maro Malupu is a 1982 Indian Telugu-language film directed by Vejella Satyanarayana. This Nandi Award-winning film is based on the Caste system in India and social conditions. The film won three Nandi Awards.

Credits

Cast
 Gummadi
 Narasimha Raju
 Sivakrishna
 Geetha
 Leelavathi

Crew
 Director: Vejella Satyanarayana
 Writer: Paruchuri Gopala Krishna
 Music Director: G. K. Venkatesh
 Cinematographer: R. K. Raju
 Art Direction: Kondapaneni Ramalingeswara Rao
 Film Editing: Babu Rao

Songs
 Erra Errani Thamashala

Awards
Nandi Awards
 Second Best Feature Film - Silver - Sagi Krishnam Raju.
 Best Supporting Actor - Gummadi
 Best First Film of a Director - Vejella Satyanarayana

References

External links
 Maromallupu film at IMDb.

1982 films
Films scored by G. K. Venkatesh
1980s Telugu-language films